The 2018 season was the Indianapolis Colts' 66th in the National Football League and their 35th in Indianapolis. It was also their first season under head coach Frank Reich and second under the leadership of general manager Chris Ballard. Despite a 1–5 start, the Colts managed to improve on their 4–12 campaign from the year prior with a 38–10 victory over the Tennessee Titans, and a 5-game winning streak. On Week 16, the Colts achieved their first winning season since 2014 with a 28–27 win against the New York Giants. The next week, they beat the Tennessee Titans in a win or go home match-up to reach the playoffs for the first time since 2014 and became the third team in NFL history to qualify for the playoffs after a 1–5 start and first since the 2015 Chiefs.

In the Wild Card Round, the Colts defeated the Houston Texans 21–7, but lost to the Kansas City Chiefs in the Divisional Round 31–13, ending their season.

This would be the last season that the Colts would have franchise quarterback Andrew Luck, as he would retire following the season, citing his continuous struggle with injuries and no longer enjoying the game.

Offseason

Coaching changes
On December 31, 2017, the Colts parted ways with head coach Chuck Pagano, who had led the team for six seasons. After two interviews, it was widely reported that the Colts would hire New England Patriots' offensive coordinator Josh McDaniels to replace him, after McDaniels fulfilled his obligations to the Patriots in Super Bowl LII. The Colts announced on the team website that they had agreed to terms with McDaniels and scheduled a press conference with McDaniels for February 5, 2018. However, one day later, McDaniels unexpectedly withdrew from the agreement in principle to become the Colts' head coach. On February 11, 2018, after interviewing multiple candidates, including Leslie Frazier and Dan Campbell, the Colts announced the hiring of Frank Reich, formerly the Philadelphia Eagles' offensive coordinator.

Draft

Draft trades
The Colts traded their first-round selection (3rd overall) to the Jets in exchange for the Jets' first-round selection (6th overall), two second-round selections (37th and 49th overall), and their second-round selection in 2019.
The Colts traded a second-round selection they received from the Jets (49th overall) to the Eagles in exchange for the Eagles' second-round selection (52nd overall) and fifth-round selection (169th overall).
The Colts traded their third-round selection (67th overall) and their sixth-round selection (178th overall) to the Browns in exchange for the Browns' second-round selection (64th overall).
The Colts traded their fifth-round selection (140th overall) to the Raiders in exchange for the Raiders' fifth-round selection (159th overall) and sixth-round selection (185th overall).
The Colts traded defensive end Henry Anderson to the Jets in exchange for the Jets' seventh-round pick previously acquired from Seattle (235th overall).

Staff

Final roster

Preseason

Regular season

Schedule
The Colts' 2018 schedule was announced on April 19.

Note: Intra-division opponents are in bold text.

Game summaries

Week 1: vs. Cincinnati Bengals
Despite leading 23–10 in the second half, the Bengals managed to pull off a comeback to win 34–23. The Colts had a chance to win the game late. However, while driving down the field, Jack Doyle lost a fumble which was returned 83 yards for a touchdown, putting the game away. This was the Colts 4th straight opening day loss.

Week 2: at Washington Redskins
With the win, the Colts evened their record at 1-1.

Week 3: at Philadelphia Eagles
In a rain-filled affair, the Colts were unable to nurse a late lead, as they lost to the defending champion Eagles 20-16 and fell to 1–2.

Week 4: vs. Houston Texans
In a shootout, the Texans were able to pull it out in overtime, winning 37–34, as the Colts fell to 1–3.

Week 5: at New England Patriots

The Colts were seeking their first road win over the Patriots since their 2006 Super Bowl-winning season.

Week 6: at New York Jets

Week 7: vs. Buffalo Bills

Week 8: at Oakland Raiders

Week 10: vs. Jacksonville Jaguars

Week 11: vs. Tennessee Titans

Week 12: vs. Miami Dolphins

Week 13: at Jacksonville Jaguars

Week 14: at Houston Texans

Week 15: vs. Dallas Cowboys

Week 16: vs. New York Giants

Week 17: at Tennessee Titans

Standings

Division

Conference

Postseason

Schedule

Game summaries

AFC Wild Card Playoffs: at (3) Houston Texans

AFC Divisional Playoffs: at (1) Kansas City Chiefs

This would be Andrew Luck's last game in the NFL, as he retired before the commencement of the 2019 NFL season.

References

External links

Indianapolis
Indianapolis Colts seasons
Indianapolis Colts